Kamal Said Ibrahim (Amharic: ካማል ዕብራህም; born 26 July 1992) is a professional footballer who plays for Melbourne Knights FC in the National Premier Leagues Victoria.

Early life
Ibrahim was born in Ethiopia and migrated to Victoria with his mother, three brothers and two sisters in 2003 to escape civil war and conflict.

Club career
Ibrahim played for the VIS before earning a scholarship with AIS in 2009.

Melbourne Heart
In February 2010, he was signed by Melbourne Heart for its inaugural season on a multi-year deal. In August 2010, he was offered a 10-day trial with Polish club Legia Warszawa, which was ultimately unsuccessful. He made his début for Melbourne Heart in September 2010 against Brisbane Roar, suffering a four-nil defeat. He made a total of three appearances for the Heart, during a season in which he was hampered greatly by injuries.

South Melbourne (Loan)
After the 2010–11 A–League season, Ibrahim went on loan to VPL side South Melbourne for the 2011 Victorian Premier League season.

On 6 April 2012 it was announced that he would be leaving Melbourne Heart.

Victorian State Football
He signed for Heidelberg United for the remainder of the 2012 VPL season. After leaving Heidelberg at the end of 2012, Ibrahim signed with Port Melbourne in 2013. He won the NPL Victoria Gold Medal, the league best and fairest award, with Port Melbourne in 2015.

Ibrahim signed for reigning NPL Victoria champions Bentleigh Greens SC in mid-October, 2015, for the 2016 season. Ibrahim made his Bentleigh debut on 11 March 2016, playing 58 minutes in a 3–1 win over Avondale FC at Knights Stadium. Ibrahim scored his first goal for the Greens on 29 July 2016, in a 3–0 win over Green Gully SC in Round 23 of the NPL Victoria.

After leaving Bentleigh, Ibrahim signed for Avondale FC in December 2016. He moved to Melbourne Knights in June 2017.

Personal life
In June 2011 Ibrahim was announced as the ambassador of Football Federation Victoria's "United Through Football" program, whose aim is to support those who have recently arrived in Australia from areas such as the Horn of Africa, Iraq, Afghanistan and Burma.

Honours
With Australia:
 AFF U-19 Youth Championship: 2010
 AFF U-16 Youth Championship: 2008

References

External links
 FFA - Joeys profile 
 Melbourne Heart profile
 VIS profile

Living people
Soccer players from Melbourne
Melbourne City FC players
A-League Men players
Ethiopian emigrants to Australia
1992 births
Australian Institute of Sport soccer players
Victorian Institute of Sport alumni
National Premier Leagues players
Port Melbourne SC players
Avondale FC players
Melbourne Knights FC players
Association football forwards
Association football midfielders
Australian soccer players
Naturalised soccer players of Australia